Potassium inwardly-rectifying channel, subfamily J, member 13 (KCNJ13) is a human gene encoding the Kir7.1 protein.

See also 
 Inward-rectifier potassium ion channel

References

Further reading

External links 
 

Ion channels